Józef Rogacki (born 21 November 1953, in Gorzałów) is a Polish politician who is a current Member of Kuyavian-Pomeranian Regional Assembly.

Biography

Kalisz career 
Between 1990 and 1998 he was a Member of the Kalisz City Council. Between 1990 and 1994 he was a Vice-President (= Vice-Mayor) of Kalisz also. Until 1998 he was a member of city executive board. In 1998 he was a last Governor of Kalisz Voivodeship (wojewoda kaliski) in Cabinet of Jerzy Buzek.

Kuyavian-Pomeranian Career 
In 1998 local election he joined the Greater Poland Regional Assembly I term, but he resign after his nominations as 1st Governor of Kuyavian-Pomeranian Voivodeship (wojewoda kujawsko-pomorski) in Cabinet of Jerzy Buzek. In 2001 new Prime Minister nominated new governor.

In 2006 local election he joined the Kuyavian-Pomeranian Regional Assembly III term representing the 1st district. He scored 4,972 votes, running on the Law and Justice list.

He is a president of Forest Park of Culture and Leisure "Myślęcinek" (Leśny Parku Kultury i Wypoczynku „Myślęcinek”, LPKiW), municipal limited liability company.

Personal life 
Józef Rogacki and his wife, Elżbieta, have one son, Adam and three grandchildren.

See also 
 Kuyavian-Pomeranian Voivodeship

References

External links 
 (pl) Kuyavian-Pomeranian Regional Assembly webside
 (pl) (en) (de) Myślęcinek webside

1953 births
Living people
People from Sieradz County
Solidarity Electoral Action politicians
Law and Justice politicians
Members of Greater Poland Regional Assembly
Members of Kuyavian-Pomeranian Regional Assembly
Voivodes of Kuyavian-Pomeranian Voivodeship